Face the Sun is the fourth studio album by South Korean boy band Seventeen. It was released on May 27, 2022 by Pledis Entertainment through YG Plus. The album contains nine tracks, with "Hot" serving as lead single. The first track, "Darling", was pre-released on April 15, 2022. The repackaged version of the album, titled Sector 17, released on July 18 alongside its lead single "World". The fourth track, "Cheers", was pre-released on July 7, 2022.

Background 
In March, seven months after the release of the commercially successful EP Attacca, Pledis Entertainment announced that Seventeen would be releasing a studio album, their first since An Ode (2019), in May. Following the release of the group's first-ever English single "Darling" on April 15, the label confirmed that Seventeen would return on May 27 with a fourth studio album titled Face the Sun. Starting on April 26, the group released "Inner Shadows", a 13-part trailer on YouTube to tease the new album. Described by band member Hoshi as marking the "shedding [of their] former image and becoming more mature", the album greatly contrasts with their earlier, more cheerful concepts.

Release and promotion 
Pre-orders for the album opened on April 22. On May 23, a highlight medley was released, as a preview of the 9 tracks of the album. The album will be supported by the 'Be the Sun' World Tour, their first tour after the Ode to You Tour, which ended prematurely in early 2020 due to the COVID-19 pandemic. The Be the Sun tour began in Seoul, followed by stops in North America and Asia.

Seventeen released a trailer for the reissue of the album, titled Sector 17, at their concert in Seoul. Sector 17 was released on July 18, 2022.

Commercial performance 
Face the Sun surpassed 1.74 million pre-orders in one week, exceeding Seventeen's previous career high of 1.41 million pre-orders for Attacca. On May 20, it was reported that the album had recorded two million pre-orders. According to the Gaon Music Chart, the album sold 2,239,351 copies in the month of May. Face the Sun debuted at number seven on the US Billboard 200, earning 44,000 album-equivalent units, including 42,000 pure album sales, in its first week. It is Seventeen's highest-charting and first top-ten album on the chart, having previously reached the top 20 twice in 2021 with their EPs Your Choice and Attacca.

According to Hanteo, Sector 17 sold 1,126,104 copies in its first week. Later it was reported that the EP sold 2 million copies in its first week, making Seventeen the second K-pop group to sell over 2 million copies in the first week of release.

Critical reception 
In a positive review for Teen Vogue, Sara Delgado praised Face the Sun for its "sonic versatility." For NME, Abby Webster gave Face the Sun four stars, and wrote that the album's singles paled in comparison to the album's "familiar yet sublimely inventive B-sides." Abbie Aitken for Clash wrote that "Face the Sun is a testament of Seventeen's influence as a key group within K-pop." Sarina Bhutani of MTV named Face the Sun one of the albums of the year, saying that "with the release of this album, they [Seventeen] created their most sonically settled, emotionally confident record yet".

Accolades

Track listing 

Notes
 "Darling" is stylized as "Darl+ing"
 "'Bout You" is stylized as "'bout you"
 "World" is stylized as "_WORLD"

Charts

Weekly charts

Monthly charts

Year-end charts

Certifications

References 

2022 albums
Korean-language albums
Seventeen (South Korean band) albums
Hybe Corporation albums